Sittard is a city in the Netherlands, situated in the southernmost province of Limburg.

The town is part of the municipality of Sittard-Geleen and has almost 37.500 inhabitants in 2016.

In its east, Sittard borders the German municipality of Selfkant (in the state of North Rhine-Westphalia).

The city centre is located at 45 m above sea level.

History
Archaeological discoveries have dated the first settlement in the Sittard area around 5000 B.C. Present day Sittard is assumed to have been founded around 850 A.D. and to have been built around a motte.  Sittard was first mentioned in 1157. It was granted city rights by the Duke of Limburg in 1243. In 1400 it was sold to the Duchy of Jülich, and remained in its possession until 1794. The city was destroyed and rebuilt repeatedly, due to fires and various conflicts during the 15th-17th century. It was a stronghold until it was largely destroyed in 1677, during the Franco-Dutch War. Under French occupation (1794-1814), Sittard was part of the Roer department. Since 1814, it has been part of the Netherlands, except for the years 1830–1839, when it joined the Belgian Revolution. During the Second World War, it was occupied by the Germans, who incorporated several small municipalities, like Broeksittard, into Sittard. The city was liberated September 18–19, 1944 by the 2nd Armored Division. The historic town was mostly spared destruction, despite lying in the frontline for over four months, in which over 4000 shells and rockets struck the city.

After World War II, Sittard expanded rapidly and many new neighbourhoods were built. The coal mines in the region were the driving force of a booming economy, until closed in the 1960s and 70s. It now has large industrial zones and office premises.

Main sights

Sittard has a small historic city centre with numerous architectural monuments, including several old churches (St Peter's, St Michael's, Basilica of Our Lady of the Sacred Heart), monasteries and a few half-timbered houses. The central market square has many restaurants and bars. The city has retained part of its city wall. On the south-eastern side of the city centre, the St Rosa chapel crowns the Kollenberg hill. Museum "Het Domein" is situated in a converted nineteenth century school building in the city centre. It focuses on contemporary art, urban history and archaeology. There is also a Commonwealth War Cemetery, where 239 soldiers of the Commonwealth Nations lie buried. Among them Dennis Donnini, the youngest to have received the Victoria Cross in World War II.

Economy

Sittard houses the SABIC European head office and a large DSM office; both companies having large chemical production facilities in nearby Geleen. The head office of the plant hire company Boels Rental is also located in Sittard.

Education

There are several schools for higher vocational education and training (hbo) in the city, including faculties of the Hogeschool Zuyd and Fontys Hogescholen. Large schools for secondary education in Sittard are 'Trevianum Scholengroep' (havo and vwo) and 'Da Capo College' (vmbo).

Sports

Sittard is the home of the professional football club Fortuna Sittard and of the handball club Sittardia.

The biggest Kennedy march of the Netherlands starts and ends in Sittard.

Notable people 
Charles Beltjens, poet
Eddy Beugels, cyclist
Rens Blom, athlete competing in pole vault
Mike van Diem, film director
Willy Dullens, professional football player
Toon Hermans, comedian
Frederic Adolph Hoefer, lieutenant-general
Wim Hof, The Iceman, motivational speaker and extreme athlete
Leo Horn, football referee
Francine Houben, architect, director of Mecanoo
Jan Krekels, cyclist, Olympic champion
Danny Nelissen, cyclist
Jan Nolten, cyclist
Jan Notermans, professional football player
Rineke Dijkstra, photographer
Huub Stevens, professional football player and manager
Wilbert Suvrijn, professional football player
Arnold Vanderlyde, boxer
Joost Zweegers, singer and pianist of Novastar
Laurence Stassen, VNL politician

Dialect
The Sittard dialect is a particular variant of Limburgish.

Gallery

Sister cities 
 Valjevo, .
 Hasselt,

See also 
 Vansittart, surname derived from the city.

References

External links 

Cities in the Netherlands
Municipalities of the Netherlands disestablished in 2001
Populated places in Limburg (Netherlands)
Former municipalities of Limburg (Netherlands)
Sittard-Geleen